Laurence Polinelli (19 December 1891 – 12 September 1955) was an Australian rules footballer who played with St Kilda in the Victorian Football League (VFL).

Notes

External links 

1891 births
1955 deaths
Australian rules footballers from Victoria (Australia)
St Kilda Football Club players
Maryborough Football Club players